Joseph Peter Sampedro Sison (born October 19, 1965), professionally known as Jopet Sison, is a Filipino lawyer, TV presenter, and politician who formerly served as Barangay kagawad for Barangay Pinagkaisahan, Quezon City; City Councilor for 4th district, Assistant General Manager of National Housing Authority or NHA, and President of National Home Mortgage Finance Corporation.

He was popular for being the host of legal TV program Ipaglaban Mo! together with his father, Atty. Jose C. Sison.

Early life 
Sison studied at the Ateneo de Manila University from high school to college, when he studied B.S. Legal Management. He studied law at the Manuel L. Quezon University.

Legal career 
Sison started his legal career as Trustee/Consultant for Ipaglaban Mo Foundation & Sison Law. He rendered free legal advice to viewers, letter senders, and walk-in clients. He is also conducted legal research for Sison Law. In 1992 from 1998, he served as a segment host for “Ikaw at ang Batas” and “Ito ang Batas”, a 5-minute legal segment on television narrating the facts and the laws on various cases decided by the Supreme Court of the Philippines. Currently since 2013, he serves as the President of FIRMANENT Development Corporation. He headed the Secretariat for the National Summit on Housing and Urban Development from 2015 to 2016 and it was initiated by the Joint Legislative Committee on Housing of the Senate and House of Representatives. In 2014, he joined his father to be co-host of legal program Ipaglaban Mo! and gives free legal advise at the ABS-CBN Tulong Center every Wednesday.

Political career 
Sison was elected as Barangay Kagawad for Barangay Pinagkaisahan, Quezon City from 1989 to 1992. In 1992, he run as 4th district councilor and won. When serving as councilor, he headed the Committee on Transport and Communication as its chairman, being the Assistant Minority Floor Leader, both positions he served from 1992 to 1993 as chairman. He also the chairman of Committee on Labor and Conciliation from 1993 to 1995, and in 1993, he is the founding chairman of Quezon City Tricycle Franchising Board until 1995.

On his second term, he served as the Assistant Majority Floor Leader and vice-chairman of the Committee on Laws, Rules and Internal Government from 1995 until 1998 and he also served as Chairman of Committee on Public Affairs and Information, Chairman of Committee on Revision of Ordinances and Consolidation of Proposed Legislative Measures, and Chairman of Blue Ribbon Committee, and Committee on Police, Peace, and Order concurrently from 1996 until 1998.

He ran for representative of Marikina's 1st district in 2016, but lost to Bayani Fernando. He then transferred back to Quezon City and ran for vice mayor in 2019 as the running mate of Vincent "Bingbong" Crisologo as mayor, but they both lost. In 2022, he ran for Senator under Aksyon Demokratiko and thus Isko Moreno's slate as Noli de Castro's substitute, but lost.

Personal life
He is the second of six siblings (Joyce†, Joel, Jay, Jolly and JB).

References

External links
Official website

1965 births
Living people
20th-century Filipino lawyers
Filipino television presenters
Manuel L. Quezon University alumni
Ateneo de Manila University alumni
Aksyon Demokratiko politicians
21st-century Filipino lawyers